U.S. Route 50 (US 50) is a part of the U.S. Highway System that travels from West Sacramento, California, to Ocean City, Maryland. In the U.S. state of Colorado, US 50 is a major highway crossing through the lower midsection of the state. It connects the Western Slope with the lower Front Range and the Arkansas Valley. The highway serves the areas of Pueblo and Grand Junction as well as many other smaller areas along its corridor. The long-term project to upgrade the highway from two lanes to a four lane expressway between Grand Junction and Montrose was completed in January 2005. Only about 25% of the remainder of highway 50 in Colorado is four lane expressway.

Route description

Western Slope
U.S. Highway 50 begins in Colorado at the Utah state line, concurrent with Interstate 70 as well as U.S. Highway 6. At Interstate 70 exit 11, U.S. Highway 6 & 50 end their concurrency with Interstate 70 and begin using the old highway alignment directly north of Interstate 70 while they travel through the communities of Mack, Loma, and Fruita.  These communities were bypassed by Interstate 70.  Near mile marker 15 the Colorado River adjoins Interstate 70 and runs nearby for the next . In Fruita routes 6 and 50 intersect State Highway 340, the gateway to the Colorado National Monument.  The monument's sandstone canyons and rock spires are visible to the south from the highways.

U.S. Highway 6 & 50 meet again with Interstate 70 at exit 26 where they begin a concurrent segment with Interstate 70 Business. The three routes travel southeast towards downtown Grand Junction.  U.S. Highway 6 ends it concurrency with U.S. Highway 50 and Interstate 70 Business with a free flowing, grade separated interchange at North Avenue. The two remaining routes continue south onto surface streets in downtown Grand Junction.  At Grand Avenue, they once again intersect with Colorado 340, which forms a loop between Grand Junction and Fruita.  There are several points of access to the Colorado National Monument from the highway 340 loop.

After turning onto two east–west one-way streets (Ute and Pitkin Avenues); U.S. Highway 50 detaches itself from Interstate 70 Business, crosses the Colorado River and travels as an expressway, through suburban Grand Junction, to the cities of Delta and Montrose. Leaving Grand Junction and the area known as Orchard Mesa, the highway descends into the community of Whitewater and the Gunnison River valley. It intersects with State Highway 141 and begins a short concurrency with highway 141.  Near this intersection Mount Sneffels and the Sneffels Range of the San Juan Mountains are clearly visible  to the south-southeast.

U.S. Highway 50 travels through Delta as a typical surface street, having junctions with State Highway 92 and State Highway 348. Then highway 50 heads towards Montrose in the Uncompahgre River valley,  passing through Olathe as an expressway bypass. Olathe is the home of a popular annual sweet corn festival. Agriculture in the area is greatly enhanced by irrigation water supplied by reservoirs on the Gunnison River. U.S 50 arrives in Montrose on Townsend Ave. The route then junctions with U.S. Highway 550 and turns east onto the San Juan Avenue bypass and then onto Main St. heading eastward out of Montrose.

The highway is a four-lane expressway from the Utah border to the eastern boundary of Montrose except for surface streets in the towns of Grand Junction, Delta and Montrose.  From Montrose east to the Kansas border it is primarily a two-lane highway with only short stretches of four-lane highway.  The upgrade of the last segment of highway between Utah and Montrose was completed in January 2005.  The first  of route 50 is four-lane highway.  Of the remaining , only about  had been upgraded to four lanes as of 2012, primarily around larger towns.

About ten miles east of Montrose, the highway intersects SH 347. This  highway provides access to the Black Canyon of the Gunnison National Park. The needle is now accessible only by boat since the abandoned railroad line was flooded by Morrow Point Lake, formed by the completion of the Crystal Dam in 1976. U.S. Highway 50 rises again over a third low pass before reaching State Highway 92. A short distance north of the intersection, highway 92 crosses the Blue Mesa Dam which forms Blue Mesa Reservoir, the largest body of water in the state of Colorado. Highway 50 crosses the reservoir at Middle Bridge, intersects State Highway 149 near the east end of the reservoir and continues into the town of Gunnison, home of Western Colorado University.

East of Gunnison the highway intersects with State Highway 114, passes through the communities of Parlin and Sargents and then ascends to Monarch Pass (elevation ) on the continental divide.  Monarch Pass is the highest point on the entire length of U.S. 50.

Arkansas River Valley

After descending from Monarch Pass, the highway enters the Arkansas River Valley near the town of Salida. The Arkansas is the second-longest tributary to the Mississippi-Missouri River system. U.S. 50 closely follows the Arkansas River from Salida to Kansas. East of Salida, the highway enters a deep canyon, dubbed Bighorn Sheep Canyon. There are several small communities in the canyon including Howard, Coaldale and Cotopaxi. The major industries in the canyon are fishing and river rafting.

Near mile marker 267, the highway crosses the river. Before the highway climbs uphill and leaves the canyon, Parkdale, Colorado is home to rafting, mining and a recreational area along the river. A short distance later, Colorado State Highway 9 intersects from the north as the highway enters the Royal Gorge area. Fremont County Road 3A leads to the rim of the Royal Gorge and its famous suspension bridge. It was built in 1929 and remains a popular tourist attraction that reopened to the public in 2014 after a devastating fire destroyed much of the surrounding park in 2013. The bridge remained intact but some boards were blackened. The damaged boards were replaced to maintain the integrity of the bridge.

After passing by the Royal Gorge, Highway 50 lowers off Eight Mile Hill and becomes a divided four lane highway. It then passes by the scenic route Skyline Drive on its way into Cañon City.  At 1st Street, the highway is known locally as Royal Gorge Boulevard. Fremont County, which includes Cañon City, is the home to 15 prisons, including ADX Supermax, the only federal Supermax prison in the United States, located south of Florence, Colorado.

U.S. 50 intersects State Highway 67, State Highway 115 and State Highway 120 in Fremont County before crossing into Pueblo County. Then the highway enters Pueblo West on its way to intersect with State Highway 45. Highway 50 enters Pueblo, the home of the annual Colorado State Fair, as a six-lane divided highway and joins Interstate 25.  Pueblo is at the edge of the Rocky Mountains, the beginning of the plains of southeastern Colorado.  As the highway heads east across the plains, it generally follows the path of the Arkansas River until it reaches Kansas.  Along the route it passes through several small communities including Fowler, Rocky Ford and La Junta.

Just beyond La Junta, the highway passes Bent's Old Fort National Historic Site where travelers can find information about life on the plains. The highway continues on to Las Animas, Colorado, home of Boggsville Historic Site, and Lamar.

Between Pueblo and Kansas, Highway 50 intersects with a number of state highways and U.S. highways. The U.S. highways are U.S. Highway 350, 287, 385 and 400.

Major intersections

See also
Million Dollar Highway

Related U.S. Routes
U.S. Highway 350
U.S. Highway 550

References

External links
 Colorado Highways: US 50
 Coast to Coast on US Highway 50
 Boggsville Historic Site

 Colorado
50
Transportation in Mesa County, Colorado
Transportation in Delta County, Colorado
Transportation in Montrose County, Colorado
Transportation in Gunnison County, Colorado
Transportation in Saguache County, Colorado
Transportation in Chaffee County, Colorado
Transportation in Fremont County, Colorado
Transportation in Pueblo County, Colorado
Transportation in Otero County, Colorado
Transportation in Bent County, Colorado
Transportation in Prowers County, Colorado